The Elliott's Cove Formation is a formation cropping out in Newfoundland.

Geologic formations of Canada
Cambrian Newfoundland and Labrador